is a public university in Kushiro, Hokkaido, Japan. The school was established in 1988.

External links
 Official website 

Educational institutions established in 1988
Public universities in Japan
Universities and colleges in Hokkaido
1988 establishments in Japan
Hokkaido American Football Association